Iiro Tarkki (born July 1, 1985) is a Finnish former professional ice hockey goaltender who last played with Oulun Kärpät of the Finnish Liiga. He played a solitary game in the National Hockey League (NHL) with the Anaheim Ducks. He is the younger brother of goaltender Tuomas Tarkki.

Playing career
Tarkki originally played professionally in his native Finland with Lukko, SaiPa and the Espoo Blues of the SM-liiga.
On May 6, 2011, Tarkki signed as an undrafted free agent to a one-year entry-level contract with the Anaheim Ducks.

Tarkki made his NHL debut for the Ducks on January 8, 2012, against the Columbus Blue Jackets, after primary goaltender Jonas Hiller was injured late in the first period. He led the Ducks to a 7–4 victory and racked up his first career NHL win.

On October 2, 2013, he became free agent after cancellation of a contract with Salavat Yulaev Ufa of the Kontinental Hockey League (KHL). On November 18, 2013, he moved to the Swedish Hockey League, in agreeing to a contract for the remainder of the season with Linköpings HC.

Having later returned to the Finnish Liiga, during his second season with Oulun Kärpät, Tarkki appeared in 12 games for the 2015–16 season, before his contract was terminated and immediately ended his professional career on December 31, 2015.

Career statistics

References

External links

1985 births
Living people
Anaheim Ducks players
Espoo Blues players
Finnish ice hockey goaltenders
Kokkolan Hermes players
Linköping HC players
Lukko players
Oulun Kärpät players
SaiPa players
Salavat Yulaev Ufa players
SaPKo players
Syracuse Crunch players
Undrafted National Hockey League players
People from Rauma, Finland
Sportspeople from Satakunta